Sokobanja is a spa town and municipality located in the Zaječar District of the eastern Serbia. As of 2011, the population of the town is 7,982, while population of the municipality is 16,021.

Geography 
Sokobanja is one of the most popular tourist resorts in Serbia. It is situated in the southern part of Sokobanja valley, surrounded by mountains Ozren, Devica, Janior, Rtanj, and Bukovik. The Moravica River runs through Sokobanja. It creates a canyon just 2 km before entering the town. Remains of the Roman and later medieval Serbian fortress Sokograd stand today near the canyon of Moravica.

The Moravica was known for the clear water and the abundance of the crayfish. The 1945 edition of the Politika newspaper reports about the export of the crayfish from Sokobanja, stating that "they were transported from Moravica by airplanes to Paris, London and Monte Carlo". Artificial Lake Bovan on the Moravica is situated some 10 minutes drive to the west of Sokobanja.

History 

The settlement changed name a lot during its history, but from the Roman times it was always connected to its spa function (Serbian banja): Balnea, Banja, Velika Banja ("Great Spa"), Aleksinačka Banja ("Aleksinac Spa"), Sokol Banja.

Tourism 

Sokobanja, as both the thermal and air spa, is one of the most popular tourist resorts in Serbia.

Satirist Branislav Nušić coined the rhyme Sokobanja, Soko-grad, dođeš mator, odeš mlad ("Sokobanja, Sokograd, you come old, you leave young"). He wrote it on a postcard manufactured by his friend so that he could boost the sales. After being printed in the Politika newspaper on 7 July 1934, the catchphrase became popular, surviving till today as the trademark of Sokobanja, inspiring several songs.

Spa 

There are remains of the Roman thermae: wooden foundations, bricks, mosaics and round bathtubs. During the Ottoman period, the Roman foundations were used for the Turkish bath in the 16th century. The Turks kept the original round shape of the pools as in the hamams they are usually square-shaped. Above each pool, there is a dome with holes which functions as the natural ventilation. Ottoman defter from 1560 mentions the repairs of the hammam. In the 18th century, Samuel von Schmettau wrote about the marble baths.

The first physician to the spa was appointed in 1833 by the Serbian ruling prince Miloš Obrenović, only 20 days after the town was liberated from the Ottomans. It was a surgeon Georgije Đorđe Novaković, originally Leopold Ehrlich, a Jew from Galicia, who switched to Serbian Orthodox Church after moving to Serbia. At that time, he was only one of three physicians in entire Serbia, not counting the military ambulances.

In 1834, Prince Miloš ordered the mineral waters from Sokobanja to be sent to Vienna, Austria, for testing which confirmed the positive healing effect of the water. In 1835, on prince's invitation, German geologist August von Herder among other thermal springs and mining localities, visited Sokobanja. He compared its waters to those from the Austrian spa Bad Gastein. In 1837 Prince Miloš ordered the construction of hospital (špitalj) in Sokobanja, with "20 rooms with floors", including the accommodation for the guests, physicians, and Turkish bath (hammam) workers.

On 21 June 1837, Prince Miloš signed an order for a sergeant major Lazarević from the Military-police office in Kragujevac to be sent to Sokobanja for a healing treatment. This date is today considered as the starting date of the spa tourism in Serbia. Prince renovated and expanded the Turkish bath and appointed Austrian doctor Leopold Ehrlich as the first spa doctor. Prince personally visited the spa a lot and built several other objects, like the Prince Miloš Fountain, on the road to Aleksinac, Miloš' Konak in downtown Sokobanja, today a restaurant, and Miloš' bathtub in the hammam. The prince's bathtub, which still in use today just as the entire hammam complex, is short but deep, has its own tap and is placed in a separate room. There are two other pools, "male" and "female", with hot water from the underground springs.

The spa became quite popular among the cultural elite and was visited by writers, poets, painters, sculptors, actors, directors. Apart from Nušić, it was visited by Jovan Cvijić, Isidora Sekulić, Stevan Sremac and Meša Selimović, while the Nobelist author Ivo Andrić draw a graphic of the town. During World War II, Andrić moved from Belgrade to Sokobanja in 1942 for a while. He originally stayed in the villa Mon repos and then moved to "Bota", which is today within the hospital complex. According to Andrić's diary, during his stay in the spa, he finished the short story Snake and began writing some of his most important works: novels The Bridge on the Drina and Woman from Sarajevo and short story Jelena, the woman of my dream. Re-visiting Sokobanja and the villa "Bota" in 1973, Andrić wrote: "I am fearful, this place will become famous. The world will rush in and I will have to run away from here and try to find a new spa. But where can I find beauty and peace like this?".

The Turkish bath in Sokobanja is the only still functioning such facility in eastern Serbia. Under the name Staro banjsko kupatilo ("Old spa bath") it is protected by the state and declared a cultural monument. It is colloquially also called Roman bath or Turkish bath-Amam. The venue served as the setting for the "Serbian box office wonder", the film Zona Zamfirova in 2002. The bath was renovated in 2005.

The illnesses which are being treated in the spa include asthma, bronchitis, emphysema, respiratory infections, allergies in children, cardiovascular diseases, rheumatism, neurological and gynecological illnesses, physical and psychic exhaustion, etc.

Soko Grad 

The fortress was declared a Monument of Culture of Great Importance in 1982, and it is protected by Republic of Serbia.

The fortress originates from the Roman, early Christian period. It was founded in the 6th century during the reign of Emperor Justinian I, to prevent incursions of Pannonian Avars and Slavs into the Balkan peninsula. In 1172, it was occupied by Stefan Nemanja and became part of the medieval Serbian state. There is evidence that the fortress was razed during Stefan Nemanja's rule, as part of the prosecution of the Bogumils.

The fort was rebuilt and expanded in the late 13th and early 14th centuries on the foundations of the Roman fort. It was mentioned later during the reign of Despot Stefan Lazarević. The Ottoman Empire occupied it in 1398. The town was destroyed in 1413 by the Ottomans during the 1402–13 civil war, in the battle between Musa Çelebi and the local Turkish chieftain Hamuz Beg. Today the only visible remains of the upper town are the gate, walls, and three towers.

Vrmdža 

In the village of Vrmdža,  to the north, there are remains of another fort, Town of Vrmdža (Vrmdžanski grad). It was also originally a Roman fortress built during the rule of Emperor Justinian I and was also destroyed in 1413.

The village was revived in the 21st century, with the growing tourism on the Rtanj mountain. The villagers began to revitalize the objects, with the help of the village diaspora from the United States, Switzerland and Italy. Some immigrants returned with families, but also some foreigners moved their families to Vrmdža, renovating over 40 houses. The old school, built in 1851 and operational until 1863, and then being turned into the monastery's konak, has been adapted into the museum. There are also a monument to the soldiers of World War I and an unusual medieval church. Dating from the 13th century, it has only one room and frescoes on the ceiling. It was reconstructed and annexed in 1819.

The locality is close to the former Tsarigrad Road, which connected Belgrade and Istanbul. Next to the road are two rocks, named Nikolina stena and Devojačka stena after the folk tales. The first one was named after a young man Nikola who slipped and got killed after trying to pick a flower for his girlfriend, while the other ("Girl's") was named after a girl who committed suicide by jumping of it so that she wouldn't be ravaged by the Ottomans. There is also a Vrmdža Lake, old renovated watermill, wooden bridge over the Oravica stream, and a sawmill.

Other features 

Other attractions include swimming in the Moravica river and the Lake Bovan, which is especially popular among fishermen, galleries, museums, various concerts and festivities, hiking, wellness centers, hotels, aqua park, saunas, etc. Festivals include "Saint John the Herbs-picker" (in July; dedicated to the medicinal herbs picking on the surrounding mountains of Ozren, Rtanj, and Devica), "Green Heart Fest" (in July; the rock and house music festival) and "Marathon of the wishes" (in September). Since 1983, a "Golden hands" cooking festival has been held annually in July. Only the old, traditional local meals are prepared. Hiking is organized on the Ozren, Rtanj, Devica, and Bukovik mountains, while the popular excursion sites are the Sesalac cave, Očno, Kalinovica and Lepterija, known for the natural phenomenon, an apparent image of the Mother of God in the boulder.

In the neighborhood of Gradašnica, on the river of the same name, there were 13 watermills, built from the early 19th century. They all went out of service by the 1960s. One of them has been renovated and became operational again, but only for the touristic purposes so that visitors can grind the cereals and knead dough themselves. On Ozren Mountain there is a large, single boulder in the middle of the vast meadow. It has been called the "Stone of love" as, allegedly, those who exchange kisses of vows sitting on the rock will stay together forever. According to the folk story, military commander and rebel Hajduk-Veljko and female hajduk Čučuk Stana, exchanged vows at this location.

Special hospitals for lung diseases (Hospital for non-specific lung diseases, founded in 1978) and ophthalmology are situated on Ozren mountain, surrounded by the forest. The lung hospital is a legal successor of the original, 1837 hospital. Major boost to the tourism was opening of the Hotel Sunce ("Sun") in 1977. The edifice with specific design is located next to the Moravica river in the eastern section of Sokobanja. The town center of Sokobanja is home to the 19th-century buildings of elementary school and Serbian Orthodox church.

In the village of Jošanica,  to the northwest, there is a Church of the Dormition of the Mother of God. Founded in the 11th century, it is the oldest existing church in eastern Serbia. Closer to Sokobanja, on the Ozren mountain, there is a Jermenčić Monastery, founded in the 14th century by the Armenians who were fleeing the invading Ottomans. Southeast of Sokobanja, on the slopes of Ozren, there is a seasonal Ripaljka waterfall. It exists only during the spring after the snow melts on the mountain. Already by May, it is usually dry.

Demographics 

According to 2011 census of population, there were 16,021 inhabitants in the municipality and 7,982 in the town and municipal seat. The area has been depopulating for decades. The number of inhabitants in the municipality peaked in 1953 (pop. 24,621), while the largest population in the town was recorded in 1991 (pop. 8,439).

Settlements 

Aside from the town of Sokobanja, the municipality consists of the following villages (2011 population):

Economy
The following table gives a preview of total number of registered people employed in legal entities per their core activity (as of 2018):

Gallery

See also 

 List of spa towns in Serbia
 List of places in Serbia
 Mihailo Jovanović (metropolitan)

References

External links 

 

Populated places in Zaječar District
Timok Valley
Municipalities and cities of Southern and Eastern Serbia
Spa towns in Serbia